Mirzapur  station code MZP is a railway station in Mirzapur district of the Indian state of Uttar Pradesh. It lies on the Howrah–Delhi main line and Howrah–Allahabad–Mumbai line. It serves Mirzapur and the surrounding areas.

History

The Howrah–Delhi line of East Indian Railway Company was ready up to Naini in 1864 and after the Old Naini Bridge was completed through trains started running in 1865–66.

Electrification
The Dagmagpur–Cheoki section was electrified in 1965–66.

Amenities
Mirzapur railway station has two double-bedded non-AC retiring rooms.

References

External links
  Trains at Mirzapur

Railway junction stations in India
Railway stations in Mirzapur district
Allahabad railway division
Mirzapur